Inula squarrosa may refer to four different species of plants:
 Inula squarrosa Krock., a synonym for Pentanema britannica (L.) D.Gut.Larr. et al.
 Inula squarrosa Griseb., a synonym for Pentanema salicinum (L.) D.Gut.Larr. et al.
 Inula squarrosa L., a synonym for Pentanema spiraeifolium (L.) D.Gut.Larr. et al.
 Inula squarrosa Bernh. ex DC., a synonym for Pentanema squarrosum (L.) D.Gut.Larr. et al.